Shadow Creek is an eighteen-hole golf course in North Las Vegas, Nevada, USA, owned by MGM Resorts International.

History
The course opened in 1989, was built on a  site, at a reported cost of 60 million dollars. Originally operated as Steve Wynn's private club, it later opened to a limited number of MGM hotel guests. Its $500 green fee made it one of the most expensive courses open to the general public.

In 2018, it hosted The Match: Tiger vs. Phil, a match play challenge between Tiger Woods and Phil Mickelson. 

It hosted the PGA Tour's CJ Cup in October 2020, after the tournament was relocated from South Korea in response to the COVID-19 pandemic.

Since 2021, Shadow Creek has hosted the Bank of Hope LPGA Match-Play on the LPGA Tour.

Golf course
The Tom Fazio designed golf course was built by Steve Wynn in 1990. It was originally , extended to  during a 2008 redesign, when a  short game facility was added.

References

External links

1989 establishments in Nevada
Buildings and structures in North Las Vegas, Nevada
Golf clubs and courses designed by Tom Fazio
Golf clubs and courses in Nevada
Golf in Las Vegas
MGM Resorts International
North Las Vegas, Nevada